Jim Norman may refer to:
 Jim Norman (baseball) (1883–?), American baseball player
 Jim Norman (footballer) (1928–2017), Australian rules footballer
 Jim Norman (musician) (born 1948), Canadian drummer, producer and composer
 Jim Ed Norman (born 1948), American musician, record producer, arranger and label head
 Jim Norman (politician) (born 1953), American politician

See also
Jimmy Norman (1937–2011), American rhythm and blues and jazz musician and songwriter
Jimmy Norman (Galway Bay FM) (born 1970), radio presenter
James Norman (disambiguation)